Thomas Jonas (born 9 January 1991) is a professional Australian rules football player at the Port Adelaide Football Club in the Australian Football League (AFL). He made his first appearance at the senior level in the 2011 AFL season. Jonas, along with former teammate John Butcher, made his debut in round 21, against  where Port Adelaide were defeated by 165 points. To date, it remains the worst defeat suffered by any player in his debut match in VFL/AFL history.

He was suspended for six matches in 2016 for intentionally striking West Coast's Andrew Gaff, leaving Gaff unconscious for two minutes. After his suspension expired, Jonas did not play again that season due to a hamstring injury. In 2018, he said that "it felt like he was suspended for half a year".

Jonas was appointed co-captain alongside teammate Ollie Wines in the 2019 season. The following year he assumed sole responsibility for the captaincy, with Wines made vice-captain.

Statistics
Updated to the end of the round 4 2022.

|- style=background:#EAEAEA
| 2011 ||  || 42
| 4 || 0 || 0 || 10 || 21 || 31 || 3 || 8 || 0.0 || 0.0 || 2.5 || 5.25 || 7.75 || 0.75 || 2.0 
|- style=background:#EAEAEA
| 2012 ||  || 42
| 9 || 0 || 0 || 47 || 48 || 95 || 21 || 23 || 0.0 || 0.0 || 5.22 || 5.33 || 10.5 || 2.33 || 2.55 
|- style=background:#EAEAEA
| 2013 ||  || 42
| 21 || 0 || 1 || 125 || 140 || 265 || 66 || 49 || 0.0 || 0.04 || 5.95 || 6.66 || 12.6 || 3.14 || 2.33
|- style=background:#EAEAEA
| 2014 ||  || 42 
| 22 || 1 || 0 || 189 || 144 || 333 || 111 || 48 || 0.04 || 0.0 || 8.59 || 5.18 || 15.1 || 5.04 || 2.18
|- style=background:#EAEAEA
| 2015 ||  || 42
| 17 || 0 || 0 || 100 || 128 || 228 || 62 || 39 || 0.0 || 0.0 || 5.88 || 7.52 || 13.4 || 3.64 || 2.29
|- style=background:#EAEAEA
| 2016 ||  || 42 
| 9 || 0 || 1 || 63 || 51 || 114 || 32 || 20 || 0.0 || 0.11 || 7.0 || 5.66 || 12.6 || 3.55 || 2.22
|- style=background:#EAEAEA
| 2017 ||  || 42
| 21 || 0 || 0 || 186 || 100 || 286 || 111 || 54 || 0.0 || 0.0 || 8.85 || 4.76 || 13.6 || 5.28 || 2.57
|- style=background:#EAEAEA
| 2018 ||  || 42
| 18 || 0 || 0 || 215 || 86 || 301 || 141 || 35 || 0.0 || 0.0 || 11.9 || 4.77 || 16.7 || 7.83 || 1.94
|- style=background:#EAEAEA
| 2019 ||  || 42
| 18 || 0 || 0 || 197 || 86 || 283 || 95 || 36 || 0.0 || 0.0 || 10.9 || 4.77 || 15.7 || 5.27 || 2.0
|-
| 2020 ||  || 1
| 19 || 0 || 1 || 138 || 68 || 206 || 76 || 30 || 0.0 || 0.05 || 7.26 || 0.27 || 10.8 || 4.0 || 1.57
|- style=background:#EAEAEA
| 2021 ||  || 1
| 24 || 0 || 0 || 260 || 94 || 354 || 133 || 37 || 0.0 || 0.0 || 10.8 || 3.91 || 14.75 || 5.54 || 1.54
|- style=background:#EAEAEA
| 2022 ||  || 1
| 4 || 0 || 0 || 38 || 19 || 57 || 24 || 10 || 0.0 || 0.0 || 9.5 || 4.75 || 14.25 || 6 || 2.5 
|- class=sortbottom
! colspan=3 | Career
! 186 !! 1 !! 3 !! 1568 !! 985 !! 2553 !! 873 !! 389 !! 0.0 !! 0.0 !! 9.5 !! 4.75 !! 14.25 !! 6 !! 2.5 
|}

Personal life
Jonas is a Law graduate, having completed his study at The University of Adelaide.

Notes

References

External links

1991 births
Living people
Port Adelaide Football Club players
Port Adelaide Football Club players (all competitions)
Australian rules footballers from South Australia
Norwood Football Club players